United States gubernatorial elections were held in 1805, in 13 states.

Eight governors were elected by popular vote and five were elected by state legislatures.

Results

See also 
1805 United States elections

References

Notes

Bibliography